The 2017 Southeastern Conference baseball tournament was held from May 23 through 28 at Hoover Metropolitan Stadium in Hoover, Alabama. The annual tournament determined the tournament champion of the Division I Southeastern Conference in college baseball. The tournament champion earned the conference's automatic bid to the 2017 NCAA Division I baseball tournament After a search for potential new sites, the SEC named Hoover the host for the 2017 and future events, with a specific term to be negotiated.

The tournament has been held every year since 1977, with LSU claiming their twelfth championship against Arkansas, the most of any school. Original members Georgia and Kentucky along with 1993 addition Arkansas have never won the tournament. This is the nineteenth consecutive year and twenty-first overall that the event has been held at Hoover Metropolitan Stadium, known from 2007 through 2012 as Regions Park. Texas A&M joined in 2013, and won its first title in 2016. Missouri, which also joined in 2013, has yet to win the event.

Format and seeding
The regular season division winners claimed the top two seeds and the next ten teams by conference winning percentage, regardless of division, claimed the remaining berths in the tournament.  The bottom eight teams played a single-elimination opening round, followed by a double-elimination format until the semifinals, when the format reverted to single elimination through the championship game. This is the fifth year of this format.

Bracket

Schedule

References

Tournament
Southeastern Conference Baseball Tournament
Southeastern Conference baseball tournament
Southeastern Conference baseball tournament
College sports tournaments in Alabama
Baseball competitions in Hoover, Alabama